Caenocentrotus gibbosus is a species of sea urchins of the Family Echinometridae. Their armour is covered with spines. Caenocentrotus gibbosus was first scientifically described in 1846 by L. Agassiz, in L. Agassiz & Desor.

References 

Echinometridae
Animals described in 1846